At the 1952 Winter Olympics in Oslo, one Nordic combined event was contested.
This marked the first time in Olympic history that the ski jumping portion of the competition was held before the 18 km cross-country skiing segment.

Medalists

Results

Participating NOCs

Eleven nations participated in nordic combined at the Oslo Games. Romania made their first, and as of 2010, only appearance in the sport.

References

External links
 Official Olympic Report
 Sports-Reference - 1952 Olympics - Nordic Combined - Individual

 
1952 Winter Olympics events
1952
1952 in Nordic combined
Nordic combined competitions in Norway
Men's events at the 1952 Winter Olympics